The Turin King List, also known as the Turin Royal Canon, is an ancient Egyptian hieratic papyrus thought to date from the reign of Pharaoh Ramesses II, now in the Museo Egizio (Egyptian Museum) in  Turin. The papyrus is the most extensive list available of kings compiled by the ancient Egyptians, and is the basis for most chronology before the reign of Ramesses II.

Creation and use
The papyrus is believed to date from the reign of Ramesses II, during the middle of the New Kingdom, or the 19th Dynasty. The beginning and ending of the list are now lost; there is no introduction, and the list does not continue after the 19th Dynasty. The composition may thus have occurred at any subsequent time, from the reign of Ramesses II to as late as the 20th Dynasty.
 
The papyrus lists the names of rulers, the lengths of reigns in years, with months and days for some kings. In some cases they are grouped together by family, which corresponds approximately to the dynasties of Manetho's book. The list includes the names of ephemeral rulers or those ruling small territories that may be unmentioned in other sources.

The list also is believed to contain kings from the 15th Dynasty, the Hyksos who ruled Lower Egypt and the River Nile delta. The Hyksos rulers do not have cartouches (enclosing borders which indicate the name of a king), and a hieroglyphic sign is added to indicate that they were foreigners, although typically on King Lists foreign rulers are not listed.

The papyrus was originally a tax roll, but on its back is written a list of rulers of Egypt – including mythical kings such as gods, demi-gods, and spirits, as well as human kings. That the back of an older papyrus was used may indicate that the list was not of great formal importance to the writer, although the primary function of the list is thought to have been as an administrative aid. As such, the papyrus is less likely to be biased against certain rulers and is believed to include all the kings of Egypt known to its writers up to the 19th or 20th Dynasty.

Discovery and reconstruction
The papyrus was found by the Italian traveler Bernardino Drovetti in 1820 at Luxor (Thebes), Egypt and was acquired in 1824 by the Egyptian Museum in Turin, Italy and was designated Papyrus Number 1874. When the box in which it had been transported to Italy was unpacked, the list had disintegrated into small fragments. Jean-Francois Champollion, examining it, could recognize only some of the larger fragments containing royal names, and produced a drawing of what he could decipher. A reconstruction of the list was created to better understand it and to aid in research.

The Saxon researcher Gustav Seyffarth (1796–1885) re-examined the fragments, some only one square centimeter in size, and made a more complete reconstruction of the papyrus based only on the papyrus fibers, as he could not yet determine the meaning of the hieratic characters. Subsequent work on the fragments was done by the Munich Egyptologist Jens Peter Lauth, which largely confirmed the Seyffarth reconstruction.

In 1997, prominent Egyptologist Kim Ryholt published a new and better interpretation of the list in his book, "The Political Situation in Egypt during the Second Intermediate Period c. 1800–1550 B.C." After another study of the papyrus, an updated version from Ryholt is expected. Egyptologist Donald Redford has also studied the papyrus and has noted that although many of the list's names correspond to monuments and other documents, there are some discrepancies and not all of the names correspond, questioning the absolute reliability of the document for pre-Ramesses II chronology.

Despite attempts at reconstruction, approximately 50% of the papyrus remains missing. This papyrus as presently constituted is 1.7 m long and 0.41 m wide, broken into over 160 fragments. In 2009, previously unpublished fragments were discovered in the storage room of the Egyptian Museum of Turin, in good condition. A new edition of the papyrus is expected.

The name Hudjefa, found twice in the papyrus, is now known to have been used by the royal scribes of the Ramesside era during the 19th Dynasty, when the scribes compiled king lists such as the Saqqara King List and the royal canon of Turin and the name of a deceased pharaoh was unreadable, damaged, or completely erased.

Contents of the papyrus
The papyrus is divided into eleven columns, distributed as follows. The names and positions of several kings are still being disputed, since the list is so badly damaged.

Column 1 – Gods of Ancient Egypt
Column 2 – Gods of Ancient Egypt, spirits and mythical kings
Column 3 – Rows 11–25 (Dynasties 1–2)
Column 4 – Rows 1–25 (Dynasties 2–5)
Column 5 – Rows 1–26 (Dynasties 6–8/9/10)
Column 6 – Rows 12–25 (Dynasties 11–12)
Column 7 – Rows 1–2 (Dynasties 12–13)
Column 8 – Rows 1–23 (Dynasty 13)
Column 9 – Rows 1–27 (Dynasty 13–14)
Column 10 – Rows 1–30 (Dynasty 14)
Column 11 – Rows 1–30 (Dynasties 14–17)

These are the actual names written on the papyrus, omitting the years, summations and headings:

The Manuel de Codage text was written using the Open Source hieroglyphic editor JSesh.

See also
List of ancient Egyptian papyri
Lists of ancient kings
List of pharaohs
Palermo Stone (An older fragmented king list)

References

Bibliography
Alan Gardiner, editor. Royal Canon of Turin. Griffith Institute, 1959. (Reprint 1988. )

George Adam Smith, "Chaldean Account of Genesis" (Whittingham & Wilkins, London, 1872) (Reprint 2005. Adamant Media Corporation) p290  Contains a different translation of the Turin Papyrus in a chart about "dynasty of gods".
Kenneth A. Kitchen "King Lists" The Oxford Encyclopedia of Ancient Egypt. Ed. Donald B. Redford. Oxford University Press, 2001.
K. Ryholt, The Political Situation in Egypt during the Second Intermediate Period. Carsten Niebuhr Institute Publications, vol. 20. Copenhagen: Museum Tusculanum Press, 1997. .
K. Ryholt, "The Turin King-List", Ägypten und Levante 14, 2004, pp. 135–155. This is a detailed description of the king-list, the information it provides, and its sources.
Málek, Jaromír. "The Original Version of the Royal Canon of Turin." Journal of Egyptian Archaeology 68, (1982): 93-106.
Spalinger, Anthony. "Review of: 'The Political Situation in Egypt during the Second Intermediate Period, c. 1800-1550 B. C.' by K.S.B. Ryholt." Journal of Near Eastern Studies 60, no. 4 (October 2001): 296-300.

External links
 Description and Translation of the king list.
Hieroglyphs with translation including Ryholt's new placement of fragments.

13th-century BC works
1820 archaeological discoveries
Manuscripts
Ancient Egyptian King lists
Papyrus
Museo Egizio